Habrostolodes is a genus of moths of the family Erebidae. The genus was erected by George Hampson in 1926.

Butterflies and Moths of the World gives this name as a synonym of Pitara Walker, 1858.

Species
Habrostolodes congressa Walker, 1858
Habrostolodes ocarina Draudt & Gaede, 1944

References

Calpinae